The 2003–04 season was Kilmarnock's fifth consecutive season in the Scottish Premier League, having competed in it since its inauguration in 1998–99. Kilmarnock also competed in the Scottish Cup and the League Cup.

Summary

Season
Kilmarnock finished tenth in the Scottish Premier League with 42 points. They reached the second round of the League Cup, losing to Brechin City and the fourth round of the Scottish Cup, losing to Rangers.

Results and fixtures

Scottish Premier League

Scottish League Cup

Scottish Cup

Player statistics

|}

Final league table

Division summary

Transfers

Players in

Players out

References

External links
 Kilmarnock 2003–04 at Soccerbase.com (select relevant season from dropdown list)

Kilmarnock F.C. seasons
Kilmarnock